

Events 
 February 17 – Franz Liszt gives the first performance of his Piano Concerto No. 1, conducted by Hector Berlioz.
 March–June – Richard Wagner stays in London to conduct a series of concerts.
 June 13 - Twentieth opera of Giuseppe Verdi "Les vêpres siciliennes" (The Sicilian Vespers) is premiered in Paris. 
 July 5 – Jacques Offenbach inaugurates performances of operettas as director of his own theater, the Théâtre des Bouffes-Parisiens.
 Late autumn – Mily Balakirev meets Mikhail Glinka in Saint Petersburg. Their friendship cements the former's ambition to foster Russian nationalist music. 
 November 27 – Piano Trio No. 1 of Brahms is given its first public performance at Dodsworth's Hall in Manhattan on Broadway at 11th Street. It is the earliest performance of Brahms' music in the United States
 December 3 – The Piano Trio in G minor by Bedřich Smetana is given its first public performance in Prague.
 Tchaikovsky takes private music lessons with Rudolph Kündinger, who tells Tchaikovsky's father that he saw nothing to suggest a future composer.

Bands formed 
 Black Dyke Mills Band re-formed after failure of its immediate predecessor, the Queenshead Band in Queensbury, West Yorkshire, England.

Popular music 
Stephen Foster – "Come Where My Love Lies Dreaming"
George Martin Lane – "The Lone Fish Ball"
 Caroline Norton – "Juanita"
 words Septimus Winner (as "Alice Hawthorne") music Richard Milburn – "Listen to the Mocking Bird"

Classical music 
Georges Bizet – Symphony in C
Franz Berwald – Piano Concerto in D
Eduard Franck – String Quartet in F minor op. 49
Charles Gounod – Symphony No. 1 in D
Stephen Heller 
2 Tarantelles, Op.85
Im Walde, Op.86
Friedrich Hermann – Capriccio No.1 for 3 Violins, Op.2
Franz Liszt 
Prelude and Fugue on B-A-C-H
Les préludes, S.97
Prometheus, S.99
3 Lieder aus Schillers "Wilhelm Tell", S.292
Wie singt die Lerche schön, S.312
Anton Rubinstein – Quintet for Piano and Winds Op. 55 (probably from this year)
Camille Saint-Saëns
Six Bagatelles for piano, Op. 3
Quintet for Piano and Strings, Op. 14
Bedřich Smetana – Piano Trio in G minor, Op. 15
Louis Spohr – 6 Gesänge, Op.154

Opera 
 George Frederick Bristow – Rip van Winkle
 Fromental Halévy – 
 Jacques Offenbach – one-act operettas
 Ba-ta-clan
 Les deux aveugles
 Giuseppe Verdi – Les vêpres siciliennes

Musical theatre 
 Po-ca-hon-tas, or The Gentle Savage (Music: James Gaspard Maeder, Book and Lyrics: John Brougham) Broadway production opened Wallack's Lyceum Theatre on December 24 and transferred to the Bowery Theatre on June 28, 1856.  Featuring John Brougham as John Smith.

Births 
January 20 – Ernest Chausson, composer (d. 1899)
February 15 – Gustav Hollaender, composer (died 1915)
February 18 – Vera Timanova, Russian pianist
March 12 – Eduard Birnbaum, cantor (died 1920)
April 18 – Josef Gruber, composer (died 1933)
May 2 – Theodore Moses Tobani, composer (died 1933)
May 9 – Julius Röntgen, composer (d. 1932)
May 10 – Carl Kiefert, conductor (died 1937)
May 11 – Anatoly Lyadov, conductor, composer and music teacher (d. 1914)
June 5 –  Hanuš Wihan, cellist (died 1920)
June 17 – Fritz Kauffmann, composer (died 1934)
July 25 – Edward Solomon, pianist, conductor and composer (died 1895)
August 2 – Cornélie van Zanten, opera singer and teacher (d. 1946)
August 27 – Domenico Salvatori, castrato singer (d. 1909)
September 6 – Ferdinand Hummel, composer (died 1928)
September 9 – Michele Esposito, pianist and composer (d. 1929)
October 16 – William Barclay Squire, musicologist (died 1927)
October 30 – Károly Aggházy, composer (died 1918)
November 1 – Guido Adler, musicologist (died 1941)
November 6 – Paul Kalisch, singer (d. 1946)
December 7 – Gunhild Rosén, ballerina
December 23 – Alan Gray, composer (died 1935)
December 26 – Arnold Mendelssohn, composer (died 1933)

Deaths 
January 25 – Gaetano Rossi, librettist (b. 1774)
February 1 – Claus Harms, researcher of Lutheran hymns (b. 1778)
February 27 – Louis Lambillotte, composer and music palaeographer (b. 1796)
March 17 – Ramon Carnicer, conductor and composer (b. 1789)
April 12 – Pedro Albéniz, pianist and composer (b. 1795)
April 30 – Henry Rowley Bishop, composer (b. 1786)
September 27 – August Lanner, conductor and composer (b. 1835)
November 9 – Domenico Cosselli, operatic bass-baritone (b. 1801)
November 21 – Olea Crøger, collector of Norwegian folk tunes (b. 1801)
November 25 – Thomas Commuck, composer (born 1804)
December 2 – Frédéric Bérat, songwriter and composer (b. 1801)
 Marie Antoinette Petersén, singer and member of the Royal Swedish Academy of Music (b. 1771)

References

 
19th century in music
Music by year